The 1917–18 LSU Tigers basketball team represents Louisiana State University during the 1917–18 college men's basketball season. The coach was C. C. Stroud.

References

LSU Tigers basketball seasons